The 2019 Women's Sultana Bran Hockey One was the inaugural women's edition of Hockey Australia's national league, Hockey One. The tournament was held across 7 states and territories of Australia. The tournament started on 29 September and culminated on 16 November 2019.

The grand final of the tournament was hosted by HC Melbourne, as the top ranked team to qualify for the final.

Brisbane Blaze won the tournament after defeating HC Melbourne 3–2 in a penalty shoot-out after the final finished as a 1–1 draw. Adelaide Fire finished in bronze position, following results from the pool stage.

Competition format

Format
The 2019 Hockey One will follow a similar format to that of the final edition of the Australian Hockey League. Teams will play a series of home and away matches during the Pool Stage, which will be followed by a Classification Round.

During the pool stage, teams play each other once in either a home or a way fixture. The top four ranked teams will then qualify for the Classification Round, playing in two semi-finals with the winners contesting a grand final. Team 1 will host Team 4, while Team 2 will host Team 3. Of the two victorious teams, the higher ranked team from the pool stage will host the grand final.

Rules
In addition to FIH sanctioned rules, Hockey Australia is implementing the following rules for Hockey One:

 When a field goal or penalty stroke is scored the same athlete will have an automatic one-on-one shootout with the goalkeeper for an extra goal.
 Outright winner: There will be no drawn games. In the event of a draw, teams will contest a penalty shoot-out to determine a winner.

Point allocation
Match points will be distributed as follows:

 5 points: win
 3 points: shoot-out win
 2 points: shoot-out loss
 0 points: loss

Participating teams
The seven teams competing in the league come from Australia's states and territories, with the Northern Territory being the only team absent.

Head Coach: Melody Cooper

Linzi Appleyard
Brooklyn Buchecker
Jane Claxton
Emma de Broughe
Holly Evans (C)
Rachel McCann
Emily Grist
Sarah Harrison
Amy Hunt
Euleena MacLachlan
Karri McMahon
Gabrielle Nance
Harriet Shand
Michaela Spano
Leah Welstead
Gemma McCaw
Leah Butt
Kate Denning
Amy Hammond (GK)
Ashlee Wells (GK)

Head Coach: Nikki Taylor

Savannah Fitzpatrick
Madison Fitzpatrick
Layla Eleison
Ashlea Fey
Ambrosia Malone
Morgan Gallagher
Jodie Kenny (C)
Jordyn Holzberger
Jesse Reid
Madeline James
Ashlyn McBurnie
Kendra Fitzpatrick
Rebecca Greiner
Meg Pearce
Hannah Astbury (GK)
Dayle Dolkens
Morgan Mathison
Aleisha Neumann
Renee Taylor
Britt Wilkinson
Ruby Harris
Claire Colwill
Georgia Hillas
Emily Witheyman-Crump (GK)

Head Coach: Ian Rutledge

Mikayla Evans
Brooke Peris
Jessica Smith
Naomi Evans
Samantha Economos
Rebecca Lee
Sophie Gaughan
Aleisha Price
Edwina Bone (C)
Yui Ishibashi
Shihori Oikawa
Beckie Middleton
Olivia Martin
Anna Flanagan
Taylor Thomson
Kalindi Commerford
Tina Taseska
Meredith Bone
Sakiyo Asano (GK)
Talei Forrest (GK)

Head Coach: Tim Strapp

Sophie Taylor
Aisling Utri
Nicola Hammond
Kristina Bates
Claire Messent (C)
Kary Chau
Olivia Colasurdo
Lily Brazel
Laura Desmet
Takara Haines
Carly James
Laura Barden
Hayley Padget
Florine van Grimbergen
Madeleine Ratcliffe
Samantha Snow
Hannah Gravenall
Rachael Lynch (GK)
Nikki Bosman (GK)
Amy Lawton

Head Coach: Katrina Powell

Sarah Johnston
Emily Chalker
Jessica Parr (GK)
Grace Stewart
Greta Hayes
Mikaela Patterson
Kaitlin Nobbs
Emma Spinks
Jessica Watterson
Georgina Morgan
Morgan Blamey
Maddison Smith
Alice Arnott
Kate Jenner (C)
Abigail Wilson
Mariah Williams
Renee Robinson
Casey Sablowski
Courtney Schonell
Jocelyn Bartram (GK)

Head Coach: Edward Welch

Phillipa Morgan
Candyce Peacock
Jemma Buckley (C)
Jacqui Day
Penny Squibb
Georgia Wilson
Shanea Tonkin
Rachel Frusher
Liné Malan
Roos Broek
Caitilin Pascov
Karri Somerville
Annie Gibbs
Renee Rockliff
Aleisha Power (GK)
Caitlin Cooper (GK)
Jade Vanderzwan
Jolie Sertorio
Agueda Moroni
Chloe Pendlebury

 Tassie Tigers|bodystyle=font-size:110%}}
Head Coach: Luke Doerner

Sarah McCambridge
Amelia Spence (C)
Hannah Richardson
Nicole Geeves
Molly Haas
Jean Flanagan
Madeleine Hinton
Holly Bonde (GK)
Emily Donovan
Laura Spandler
Isabelle Sharman
Samantha Lawrence
Phillida Bridley
Jessica Chesterman
Sophie Rockefeller
<li value=19>Esmee Broekhuizen
Kateřina Laciná
Lauren Canning
Ruby-Rose Gibson-Haywood (GK)
Caashia Karringten

Venues

Results

Pool stage
 Canberra Chill
|name_NSW =  NSW Pride
|name_BRI =  Brisbane Blaze
|name_ADL =  Adelaide Fire
|name_TAS =  Tassie Tigers
|name_MEL =  HC Melbourne
|name_PER =  Perth Thundersticks

|winpoints=5
|OTwinpoints=3
|OTlosspoints=2
|losspoints=0

|class_rules = 1) points; 2) matches won; 3) goal difference; 4) goals for; 5) head-to-head result; 6) field goals scored.

|res_col_header=Q
|col_Q=green1 |text_Q=Semi-finals
}}

Matches

|score   = 1–2
|team2   =  Adelaide Fire
|goals1  = Arnott 
|report  = Report
|goals2  = McMahon Spano 
|stadium = Sydney Olympic Park, Sydney
|umpires = Michelle Farnill (AUS)Cassidy Gallagher (AUS)
}}

|score   = 2–2
|team2   =  Brisbane Blaze
|goals1  = N. Evans 
|report  = Report
|goals2  = Malone 
|penalties1 = E. Bone Middleton N. Evans Commerford Peris 
|penaltyscore = 3–2
|penalties2 =  Malone S. Fitzpatrick Holzberger Fey M. Fitzpatrick
|stadium = National Hockey Centre, Canberra
|umpires = Emily Carroll (AUS)Kristy Robertson (AUS)
}}

|score   = 1–3
|team2   =  HC Melbourne
|goals1  = Tonkin 
|report  = Report
|goals2  = Messent Ratcliffe 
|stadium = Perth Hockey Stadium, Perth
|umpires = Tamara Leonard (AUS)Kimberleigh Todd (AUS)
}}

|score   = 2–1
|team2   =  NSW Pride
|goals1  = N. Evans M. Evans 
|report  = Report
|goals2  = Blamey 
|stadium = National Hockey Centre, Canberra
|umpires = Emily Carroll (AUS)Michelle Farnill (AUS)
}}

|score   = 0–4
|team2   =  Adelaide Fire
|goals1  =
|report  = Report
|goals2  = Spano Nance De Broughe 
|stadium = Tasmanian Hockey Centre, Hobart
|umpires = Deborah O'Connell (AUS)Tamara Leonard (AUS)
}}

|score   = 1–0
|team2   =  Brisbane Blaze
|goals1  = Desmet 
|report  = Report
|goals2  =
|stadium = State Netball and Hockey Centre, Melbourne
|umpires = Nicola Brown (AUS)Rhiannon Murrie (AUS)
}}

|score   = 5–0
|team2   =  Tassie Tigers
|goals1  = Wilson 
|report  = Report
|goals2  =
|stadium = Sydney Olympic Park, Sydney
|umpires = Cassidy Gallagher (AUS)Kristy Robertson (AUS)
}}

|score   = 1–1
|team2   =  Canberra Chill
|goals1  = Somerville 
|report  = Report
|goals2  = Oikawa 
|penalties1 = Broek Moroni Rockliff Pascov Tonkin 
|penaltyscore = 1–0
|penalties2 =  Taseska Middleton Evans Balfour Ishibashi
|stadium = Perth Hockey Stadium, Perth
|umpires = Melissa Trivic (AUS)Kimberleigh Todd (AUS)
}}

|score   = 2–4
|team2   =  Brisbane Blaze
|goals1  = Spano 
|report  = Report
|goals2  = Harris Fey Wilkinson Eleison 
|stadium = State Hockey Centre, Adelaide
|umpires = Emily Carroll (AUS)Nicola Brown (AUS)
}}

|score   = 5–0
|team2   =  Tassie Tigers
|goals1  = Harris Wilkinson Fey 
|report  = Report
|goals2  =
|stadium = Queensland State Hockey Centre, Brisbane
|umpires = Emily Ogden (AUS)Kerryl Chandler (AUS)
}}

|score   = 2–0
|team2   =  Canberra Chill
|goals1  = Ratcliffe Gravenall 
|report  = Report
|goals2  =
|stadium = State Netball and Hockey Centre, Melbourne
|umpires = Nicola Brown (AUS)Rhiannon Murrie (AUS)
}}

|score   = 1–2
|team2   =  Perth Thundersticks
|goals1  = McCaw 
|report  = Report
|goals2  = Broek 
|stadium = State Hockey Centre, Adelaide
|umpires = Tamara Leonard (AUS)Kristy Robertson (AUS)
}}

|score   = 2–7
|team2   =  HC Melbourne
|goals1  = Wilson Sablowski 
|report  = Report
|goals2  = Lawton Utri Messent Hammond Ratcliffe 
|stadium = Sydney Olympic Park, Sydney
|umpires = Cassidy Gallagher (AUS)Michelle Farnill (AUS)
}}

|score   = 3–0
|team2   =  Perth Thundersticks
|goals1  = Fey Harris 
|report  = Report
|goals2  =
|stadium = Queensland State Hockey Centre, Brisbane
|umpires = Kerryl Chandler (AUS)Tamara Leonard (AUS)
}}

|score   = 2–1
|team2   =  Tassie Tigers
|goals1  = N. Evans 
|report  = Report
|goals2  = Canning 
|stadium = National Hockey Centre, Canberra
|umpires = Emily Carroll (AUS)Kristy Robertson (AUS)
}}

|score   = 4–0
|team2   =  Canberra Chill
|goals1  = De Broughe Spano Nance Shand 
|report  = Report
|goals2  =
|stadium = State Hockey Centre, Adelaide
|umpires = Emily Ogden (AUS)Rhiannon Murrie (AUS)
}}

|score   = 2–0
|team2   =  NSW Pride
|goals1  = Moroni Somerville 
|report  = Report
|goals2  =
|stadium = Perth Hockey Stadium, Perth
|umpires = Melissa Trivic (AUS)Kimberleigh Todd (AUS)
}}

|score   = 2–5
|team2   =  HC Melbourne
|goals1  = Haas 
|report  = Report
|goals2  = Gravenall Desmet Ratcliffe 
|stadium = Tasmanian Hockey Centre, Hobart
|umpires = Deborah O'Connell (AUS)Kerryl Chandler (AUS)
}}

|score   = 5–3
|team2   =  Perth Thundersticks
|goals1  = McCambridge Rockerfeller Bridley 
|report  = Report
|goals2  = Somerville Rockliff Vanderzwan 
|stadium = Tasmanian Hockey Centre, Hobart
|umpires = Kerryl Chandler (AUS)Michelle Farnill (AUS)
}}

|score   = 2–0
|team2   =  NSW Pride
|goals1  = Kenny M. Fitzpatrick 
|report  = Report
|goals2  =
|stadium = Queensland State Hockey Centre, Brisbane
|umpires = Tamara Leonard (AUS)Deborah O'Connell (AUS)
}}

|score   = 1–1
|team2   =  Adelaide Fire
|goals1  = Bates 
|report  = Report
|goals2  = McMahon 
|penalties1 = Bates Utri Gravenall Hammond Ratcliffe 
|penaltyscore = 3–4
|penalties2 =  Nance Spano Claxton McMahon De Broughe
|stadium = State Netball and Hockey Centre, Melbourne
|umpires = Nicola Brown (AUS)Rhiannon Murrie (AUS)

}}

Classification stage
 HC Melbourne (p.s.o)|0 (1)| Canberra Chill|0 (0)
|9 November 2019| Brisbane Blaze|3| Adelaide Fire|0

|16 November 2019| HC Melbourne|1 (2)| Brisbane Blaze (p.s.o)|1 (3)

|RD1=Semi-finals |RD2=Grand Final

|skipmatch01=no|skipmatch02=no|skipmatch03=no

|team-width=185|score-width=55|bold_winner=high
}}

Semi-finals
 
|score   = 3–0
|team2   =  Adelaide Fire
|goals1  = K. Fitzpatrick Wilkinson M. Fitzpatrick 
|report  = Report
|goals2  =
|stadium = Queensland State Hockey Centre, Brisbane
|umpires = Rhiannon Murrie (AUS)Tamara Leonard (AUS)
}}

 
|score   = 0–0
|team2   =  Canberra Chill
|goals1  =
|report  = Report
|goals2  =
|penalties1 = Bates Utri Ratcliffe Lawton 
|penaltyscore = 1–0
|penalties2 =  Commerford E. Bone Taseska N. Evans Peris
|stadium = State Netball and Hockey Centre, Melbourne
|umpires = Nicola Brown (AUS)Kristy Robertson
}}

Grand final
 
|score   = 1–1
|team2   =  Brisbane Blaze 
|goals1  = Van Grimbergen 
|report  = Report
|goals2  = Wilkinson 
|penalties1 = Taylor Utri Barden Lawton Ratcliffe ——Ratcliffe 
|penaltyscore = 2–3
|penalties2 =  Fey S. Fitzpatrick Malone Eleison M. Fitzpatrick—— Malone
|stadium = State Netball and Hockey Centre, Melbourne
|umpires = Michelle Farnill (AUS)Tamara Leonard (AUS)
}}

Awards

Statistics

Final standings
 Canberra Chill
|name_NSW =  NSW Pride
|name_BRI =  Brisbane Blaze
|name_ADL =  Adelaide Fire
|name_TAS =  Tassie Tigers
|name_MEL =  HC Melbourne
|name_PER =  Perth Thundersticks

|winpoints=5
|OTwinpoints=3
|OTlosspoints=2
|losspoints=0

|result1=1st |result2=2nd |result3=SF |result4=SF |result5=GS |result6=GS |result7=GS
|pos_BRI= |pos_MEL= |pos_ADL= |split2=yes |split4=yes

|res_col_header=Final standing
|text_1st=Gold Medal
|text_2nd=Silver Medal
|text_SF=Eliminated inSemi-finals
|text_GS=Eliminated inGroup Stage
}}

Goalscorers
 Abigail Wilson
 Britt Wilkinson
 Michaela Spano
 Madeleine Ratcliffe

|5 goals=
 Naomi Evans

|4 goals=
 Ashlea Fey

|3 goals=
 Ruby Harris
 Hannah Gravenall
 Claire Messent
 Karri Somerville

|2 goals=
 Madison Fitzpatrick
 Ambrosia Malone
 Emma de Broughe
 Karri McMahon
 Gabrielle Nance
 Phillida Bridley
 Molly Haas
 Sophie Rockerfeller
 Laura Desmet
 Aisling Utri
 Roos Broek

|1 goal=
 Mikayla Evans
 Shihori Oikawa
 Alice Arnott
 Morgan Blamey
 Casey Sablowski
 Layla Eleison
 Kendra Fitzpatrick
 Jodie Kenny
 Gemma McCaw
 Harriet Shand
 Lauren Canning
 Sarah McCambridge
 Kristina Bates
 Nicola Hammond
 Amy Lawton
 Florine van Grimbergen
 Agueda Moroni
 Renee Rockliff
 Shanea Tonkin
 Jade Vanderzwan
}}

References

External links
2019 Sultana Bran Women's Hockey One League at Hockey Australia

2019
2019 in Australian women's field hockey